Sirasa Superstar was a musical reality show conducted in Sri Lanka by the TV channel Sirasa TV. The first four seasons were inspired by the program called American Idol an American singing competition series, the fifth and sixth seasons are similar to The Voice. The seventh season was finished on 9 July 2016. The show has been succeeded by The Voice Sri Lanka from 2020 onwards.

Overview
The goal is to find the most talented upcoming singer in the country. On average, about 2,000 audition. Out of all those who audition, 100 contestants were chosen to advance. Next, each contestant is given a chance to perform two songs, and from several groups, 48 contestants are chosen by the judging panel. Then, viewers are given a limited time period to vote for their favorites in the respective rounds (that is, Final 24, Final 12, and Final 2, through the SMS system).

The 12 finalists perform one song each week (two songs in later rounds) based on who the viewers vote for. The contestant with the fewest votes is eliminated every week. The final show is held at the Sugathadasa Indoor Stadium Sugathadasa Stadium, among an audience of 240,000. According to the number of votes received by each contestant on that day, the one with the higher number is crowned the Sirasa Superstar and the other becomes the Runner-up. For Season II, the winner will be awarded an Rs. 3.4 million worth car and Rs, one million in cash, in addition to a trophy.

From season 4 to onward, the grand finale is held at the Stein Studios of Ratmalana, which is a private property of Sirasa TV. The cash prize also changed in the fifth season, where the winner won 10 million Sri Lankan rupees. The performing stages also changed from season five, with the inclusion of Battle Round and Live Audition Round.

Season 1 
The first season of Sirasa Superstar marked the beginning of reality shows in Sri Lanka. After more than 22000 contestants, final 12 was selected by the judges. All 12 finalists were males, where each contestant had different singing abilities.

Final 12 of Season I (2006) 
 Ajith Bandara (Winner)
Malith Perera (runner up)]
 Amila Perera
 Darshana Pramod
 Shihan Mihiranga
 Manjula Pushpakumara
 Nishantha Nanayakkara
 Waruna Madushanka
 Theekshana Anuradha
 Asela Eranda
 Madhawa Dassanayake
 Mohan Dharshana

Season 2 
Winner: Pradeep Rangana took the crown by displaying his versatility. While being a bright and popular student at his campus (as he is a medical student) he presented his inborn talents to the world through this competition. His versatility helped him to achieve the "Crown". His most famous songs are Sihina Ahase, Sanda Moduwella & Mey Sauwmye Rathrie. The First Runner Up was Surendra Perera who was also a very talented competitor.

A lot of people thought that it was wrong to send Gayani Madhusha home from Number 12 cause she has a stunningly gorgeous voice which most of the Superstars in this Season didn't have. Her most popular singles were: Sitha Handai, Duhulu Malak, Awa Pemwatha & Atha Dilisena.

Final 12 of Season II (2007)
 Pradeep Rangana (Winner)
 Surendra Perera 
 Amila Nadeeshani
 Gamini Susiriwardana
 Nadini Premadasa
 Sanka Dineth
 Buddhika Ushan 
 Manjula Nivanthi
 Maheshika Lakmali
 Nalinda Ranasinghe
 Wathsala Madhumali
 Gayani MadhushaThe Competitors who got the fewest SMS votes every week Season 3 

 Final 12 of Season III (After the Wildcard Round) 
Shanika Madhumali adjudged the winner of the Sirasa Super Star Season 3 was held on 8 May 2010 at the CR and FC Grounds. 12 finalists were eventually chosen, among the 107,000 who applied, hoping for a shot at stardom. Week after week, the finalists were put through grueling challenges testing their showmanship and vocal prowess and put on stage to win over the dynamic judging panel consisting of Jagath Wickramasinghe, Chandrika Siriwardene, Raju Bandara, Samitha Mudunkotuwa and Amal Perera. Lastly Shanika Madhumali and Arjuna Rookantha selected and Shanika adjudged the winner of the 'Sirasa Super Star'.

 Shanika Madhumali (Winner)
 Arjuna Rookantha
 Dumal Warnakulasuriya  
 Champika Priyashantha
 Kasun Chamikara 
 Dilki Weliwatta
 Eranda Pathum
 Lakmini Udawatta
 Thulani Sithara
 Rukman Asitha
 Chethana Sankalani
 Meena PrasadiniThe Competitors who got the fewest SMS votes every week Season 4 

The fourth Season of Sirasa Superstar Generation Four.

Thisara Chanaka won the 4th season of superstar known as Generation 4. He had a soft high pitched voice that was admired by the judges Madhumadhawa Aravinda, Corin Almeda, and Nimantha Heshan. His famous song during the contest was a Hindi song "Thu hi meri shab hai" which gets enormous popularity in Sri Lanka.

In the grand finale, Sri Lankan popular cricketer, Tillakaratne Dilshan, was appointed as a judge also. This gave a much publicity all over the country.

 Final 12 of Generation Four 
 Thisara Chanaka (Winner)
 Uditha Sanjaya
 Isuru Randika
 Shahil Himansa
 Michel Christine
 Shani Angela
 Supun Perera
 Thilani Kanchana 
 Chaminda Abeywardana
 Randika Rochana
 Buddima Madushani
 Kasun Madushanka

 Season 5 - The Next Voice 

The fifth season of Sirasa Super Star is similar to The Voice. The season began in November 2012 with the blind auditions. The blind auditions ended with 22, 18, 20 contestants joining the groups of Virajini, Gamage and Mihiranga respectively. After the blind auditions, the Group Round began and then the battle rounds came up, preceding to Super Battle Rounds where the Final 12 were chosen. During the Super Battle Rounds, Dilnesha Weerakoon was against Sugath Hewage and was not chosen for the Final 12, but was added to the finals when a contestant was dropped. During the Live Shows, a Wildcard contestant who competed in the Super Battle Rounds and was not chosen for the Live Shows will be brought back to the competition and the contestant was Akila Imesh who competed in Gamage's team. The Grand Finale took place on the 8th of June 2013 announcing the winner as Dasun Madushan from Shihan Mihiranga's team. Dasun Madushan won the biggest ever cash prize given in Sri Lankan reality history of 10 million Sri Lankan rupees for the first time, and became the youngest ever artist to win so.

 The Final 12 of Season 5 
 Dasun Madushan (Winner)
 Rasintha Gayan
 Dulaj Ashen
 Dilnesha Weerakooon
 Pavithra Kasun
 Nirosh Chanaka
 Champika Dilash
 Virajini Vishwalanka
 Sugath Hewage
 Sameera Ekanayake
 Nazia Naeem
 Arosha Narmadha
 Akila Imesh won the Wild Card round.

Key:
 – Winner 
 – Runner-up
 – Third place

Season 6 - The Sixth Voice 

The sixth season of Sirasa Super Star is similar to The Voice. The season began in 2013 with the blind auditions. The blind auditions ended with 22, 18, 20 contestants joining the groups of Dumal, Heshan and Amila respectively. After the blind auditions, the Group Round began and then the battle rounds came up, preceding to Super Battle Rounds where the Final 12 were chosen. The Grand Finale took place on the 4th of July 2014 announcing the winner as Gayan Arosha from Dumal Warnakulasooriya's team. Gayan won the a cash prize of 10 million Sri Lankan rupees.

The final 12 of season 6 are stated below, only the winner and runners-up are in order.

The Final 12 of Season 6 
 Gayan Arosha (Winner)
 Chamara Prasad
 Tehani Imara
 Sathya Darshani
 Shiromi Rathnayake
 Achala Madusanka
 Nuwan Bulathsinhala
 Pubudu Harshani
 Muditha Jayakodi
 Harsha Chathuranga
 Sameera Chathuranga
 Prabakthi Jithendra
 Kamal

Season 7 

The seventh season of Sirasa Super Star underwent in Sirasa Stein Studios from October 2015 to July 2016. The season began in October 2015 and the season selected only 9 finalists in this time, not 12 finalists. On 17 January 2016, the preliminary round finished with a tragedy, where only single winner needed to enter final 8, but judges selected two winners on that day suggesting that both are very clever and both should go for the 8 finalists round. But, with these two contestants, there were 9 finalists, so it is beyond the format. Therefore, those two contestants "Piyath Rajapakse" and "Shehan Udesh" had a people's choice round and Piyth won the people's choice to enter Super 8.

The elimination of Super 8 started on 8 May 2016, where in each round two contestants will eliminate. Sammani Dinusha won first wild card round on 22 May 2016 and entered Final 7. Nelka Thilini won second wild card round on 29 May 2016 and entered final 8. For the first time in Sirasa Superstar contest, four finalists were selected by peoples' vote to decide the winner instead of usual two finalists in previous occasions. The grand final was held at Sirasa Stein Studios on 9 July 2016. Piyath Rajapakse won the 7th title of Sirasa Superstar with a brand new luxury car and a million Sri Lankan rupees.

The Finalists of Season 7
 Piyath Rajapakse
 Nilan Hettiarachchi
 Bashi Madhubashini
 Nelka Thilini

References

External links
‘ස්ටාර්ස්’ තුන් දෙනෙක් ගැන අලුත් ආරංචියක්
‘ස්ටාර්ස්’ වීඩියෝස්
‘ස්ටාර්ස්’ වීඩියෝස් සියල්ල මෙතැනින්

Sri Lankan television shows
2010s Sri Lankan television series
2000s Sri Lankan television series
2005 Sri Lankan television series debuts
2014 Sri Lankan television series endings
Sirasa TV original programming